Chamkhaleh (also Romanized as Chamkhāleh; also known as Cham Qal‘eh) was a village in Chaf Rural District, in the Central District of Langarud County, Gilan Province, Iran.

It was located on the Caspian Sea.  It has been merged into the city of Chaf and Chamkhaleh.

At the 2006 census, its population was 1,814, in 510 families.

References 

Populated places in Langarud County
Former populated places in Gilan Province
Populated coastal places in Iran
Populated places on the Caspian Sea